The list of New Jersey Transit bus routes has been split into 11 parts:

Routes 1 through 99
Routes 100 through 199
Routes 300 through 399
Routes 400 through 449
Routes 450 through 499
Routes 500 through 549
Routes 550 through 599
Routes 600 through 699
Routes 700 through 799
Routes 800 through 880
Routes above 881 (Wheels routes)